The  ('the King's desk'), also known as Louis XV's roll-top desk, is the richly ornamented royal cylinder desk which was constructed at the end of Louis XV's reign, and is now again in the Palace of Versailles.

History
The  was probably started in 1760, when the commission was formally announced. Its first designer was Jean-François Oeben, the master cabinet maker of the royal arsenal. The first step in its construction was the fabrication of an extremely detailed miniature model in wax. The full-scale desk was finished in 1769 by his successor, Jean Henri Riesener, who had married Oeben's widow. 

Secret diplomatic papers were kept inside the desk's secret drawers, whose only key the king always carried with him.

Description
The desk is covered with intricate marquetry of a wide variety of fine woods. In an oval reserve at the center of its "public" side, away from the king himself, is the marquetry head of "Silence", with forefinger to lips, a reminder of the discretion required in the king's business. Gilt-bronze moldings of plaques, statuettes, miniature busts and vases, even integral scrolling gilt-bronze candle stands, further adorn the surfaces of the desk. The original design was to have a miniature bust of Louis XV on top, but it was replaced by Minerva after his death in 1770.

His copy was the first of a number of replicas that were produced from the 1870s onwards by leading cabinetmakers in Paris, including four examples by François Linke.

References

Bibliography

 Brunhammer, Yvonne; Monique de Fayet.  Meubles et ensembles, époque Louis XVI. Paris, Éditions Charles Massin, 1965.  Pages 59, 60, 61, 65.
 Grande encyclopédie illustrée des meubles. Paris: Flammarion, 1980. Page 118.
 Histoire du mobilier.  Paris: Editions Atlas, 1979. Pages 105, 106, 107, 144.

See also

Henry VIII's writing desk
List of desk forms and types
Resolute desk

Individual desks
Palace of Versailles
Louis XV